"Duck and Run" is a song by American rock band 3 Doors Down. It was released on January 9, 2001, as the third single from their debut album The Better Life. The song became the band's third consecutive number one on the Billboard Mainstream Rock Chart, staying there for three weeks. Following the terrorist attacks on September 11, 2001, the song was placed on the list of post-9/11 inappropriate titles distributed by Clear Channel.

Live performances
"Duck and Run" was first performed live on March 12, 2000, at The Florida SpringFest in Pensacola, Florida. As of April 1, 2019, it has been performed 465 times, making it the third most performed song by 3 Doors Down.

Track listings
 UK CD single
 "Duck and Run" (album version) – 3:52
 "Better Life" (live in Amsterdam) – 3:02
 "Life of My Own" (live in Amsterdam) – 4:50
 "So I Need You" (live in Amsterdam) – 3:42

 European CD single
 "Duck and Run" (LP version) – 3:52
 "Better Life" (live in Amsterdam) – 3:02

Charts

References

2000 songs
2001 singles
3 Doors Down songs
Republic Records singles
Songs written by Brad Arnold